Camera, the general term:
 360 camera (VR camera)
 3D camcorder
 Action camera
 Animation camera
 Autofocus camera
 Backup camera
 Banquet camera
 Body camera
 Box camera
 Bridge camera
 Camcorder
 Camera phone
 Closed-circuit television camera
 Compact camera
 Compact System cameras
 Dashcam
 Digital camera
 Digital movie camera
 Digital single-lens reflex camera
 Disposable camera
 Document camera
 Event camera
 Field camera
 FireWire camera
 Folding camera
 Front-facing camera
 Gun camera
 Helmet camera
 High-speed camera
 Hidden camera (Spy camera)
 Imago camera
 Instant camera
 IP camera
 Keychain camera
 Large format camera
 Light-field camera
 Live-preview digital camera
 Medium format camera
 Mirrorless interchangeable-lens camera
 Monorail camera
 Movie camera
 Multiplane camera
 Omnidirectional camera
 Onboard camera
 Pinhole camera
 Pinspeck camera
 Plate camera
 Pocket camera
 Pocket video camera
 Point-and-shoot camera
 Polaroid camera
 Police body camera
 Pool safety camera
 Press camera
 Process camera
 Professional video camera
 Rapatronic camera
 Rangefinder camera
 Red light camera
 Reflex camera
 Remote camera
 Rostrum camera
 Schmidt camera
 Security camera
 Single-lens reflex camera
 Stat camera
 Stereo camera (3D camera)
 Still camera
 Still video camera
 Subminiature camera
 System camera
 Thermal imaging camera (firefighting)
 Thermographic camera
 Time-of-flight camera
 Toy camera
 Traffic camera
 Traffic enforcement camera
 Twin-lens reflex camera
 Video camera
 View camera
 Webcam
 Wright camera
 Zenith camera
 Zoom-lens reflex camera
 The term camera is also used, for devices producing images or image sequences from measurements of the physical world, or when the image formation cannot be described as photographic:
 Acoustic camera which makes sound visible in three dimensions
 Gamma camera
 Magnetic resonance imaging which produce images showing, internal structure of different parts of a patient's body.
 Rangefinder camera which produce images of the distance to each point in the scene.
 Ultrasonography uses ultrasonic cameras that produce images of the absorption of ultra-sonic energy.
 Virtual camera, in computing and gaming.

Cameras by type
Cameras